Brit Awards 2014  was held on 19 February 2014. It was the 34th edition of the British Phonographic Industry's annual pop Brit Awards. The awards ceremony was held at The O2 Arena in London and was presented by James Corden for the fourth consecutive year. Leading the nominations was Ellie Goulding with five nominations. Arctic Monkeys and One Direction both won the most awards, winning two awards each.
For the first time ever, a backstage livestream was broadcast on the internet, via YouTube. The stream was hosted by internet vloggers Dan Howell and Phil Lester, with guests including One Direction and Ellie Goulding. 67-year-old David Bowie became the oldest winner to date of the British Male Solo Artist award.

A new glossy black finish design statue designed by fashion designer Philip Treacy was presented for the first time.

Statuette design
The statuette for the 2014 BRIT Awards was designed by Irish milliner Philip Treacy. Taking the form of Britannia (the national personification of Britain), the trophy has been redesigned by various artists since the BRIT Awards revamp in 2011. Treacy stated that music has always been his inspiration, with the 2014 trophy being inspired by "a uniquely British genre of music, Punk." It was unveiled on 28 November 2013. The statuette has a glossy black finish, with a black and white circular hat that represents a mohawk, which sits atop the helmet at the apex of the trophy.

Performances

The Brits Are Coming: Nominations Launch Party

Nick Grimshaw hosted the launch show inside the ITV Studios in London on Thursday 9 January.

Main show performances
The following performances took place during the live broadcast on 19 February 2014.

Select performances were made available for purchase on iTunes following the ceremony, and "Pompeii/Waiting All Night" by Bastille, Rudimental and Ella Eyre debuted at number 21 on the UK Singles Chart, whilst Lorde and Disclosure's "White Noise/Royals" debuted at number 72.

Winners and nominees

Multiple nominations and awards

Brit Awards 2014 album 

The Brit Awards 2014 is a compilation and box set which includes the "62 biggest tracks from the past year". The box set has three discs with a total of sixty-two songs by various artists.

Track listing 
The set has three discs; the first disc includes twenty-one songs, the second disc includes twenty songs and the third disc includes twenty-one songs. Sam Smith, Ellie Goulding and Calvin Harris are the only artists to have more than one song in the album.

Weekly charts

References

External links
Brit Awards 2014 at Brits.co.uk
BRIT Awards 2014 Album Track listing

Brit
BRIT awards
Brit
Brit Awards
Brit Awards
Brit Awards